Vampirolepis is a genus of flatworms belonging to the family Hymenolepididae.

The genus has cosmopolitan distribution.

Species
Species:

Vampirolepis acollaris 
Vampirolepis acuta 
Vampirolepis baeri 
Vampirolepis balsaci 
Vampirolepis bihamata 
Vampirolepis brachysoma 
Vampirolepis chiangmaiensis 
Vampirolepis christensoni 
Vampirolepis coelopis 
Vampirolepis crassihamata 
Vampirolepis curvihamata 
Vampirolepis formosana 
Vampirolepis glischropi 
Vampirolepis gracilistrobila 
Vampirolepis hipposideri 
Vampirolepis iraqensis 
Vampirolepis isensis 
Vampirolepis kaguyae 
Vampirolepis kawasakiensis 
Vampirolepis kengtingensis 
Vampirolepis khalili 
Vampirolepis longicollaris 
Vampirolepis longisaccata 
Vampirolepis macrostrobiloides 
Vampirolepis magnihamata 
Vampirolepis mesopotamiana 
Vampirolepis molani 
Vampirolepis neomidis 
Vampirolepis novadomensis 
Vampirolepis novosibirskensis 
Vampirolepis pandoensis 
Vampirolepis pipistrelli 
Vampirolepis rikuchuensis 
Vampirolepis rysavyi 
Vampirolepis santacruzensis 
Vampirolepis scotophili 
Vampirolepis sessilihamata 
Vampirolepis shirotanii 
Vampirolepis siamensis 
Vampirolepis skrjabinariana 
Vampirolepis soltysi 
Vampirolepis spasskii 
Vampirolepis sunci 
Vampirolepis taiwanensis 
Vampirolepis tanegashimensis 
Vampirolepis urawaensis 
Vampirolepis versihamata 
Vampirolepis wakasensis 
Vampirolepis yakushimaensis

References

Cestoda
Cestoda genera